Rowsley railway station was a railway station on the Serviceton railway line. It was opened in 1889 when the track was laid through the small town of Rowsley, Victoria. A siding replaced the station in 1959. It was once the location of a branch line to Maddingley Mine.

References 

Disused railway stations in Victoria (Australia)
Railway stations in Australia opened in 1889